This article shows past squads from the Puerto Rican professional volleyball team Llaneras de Toa Baja from the Liga de Voleibol Superior Femenino.

2010
Final Standing: First Runner-Up
As of March 2010
 Head Coach:  Juan Carlos Núñez
 Assistant coach:  Gabriel Rodríguez

2009
 Awards: League Championship.
 Head Coach:  Juan Carlos Núñez
 Assistant coach:  Julio Ruvira

Release or Transfer

2008
 Head Coach:  Luis E. Ruiz
 Assistant coach:  Yarelis Rodríguez

Release or Transfer

2007
 Head Coach:  David Alemán
 Assistant coach:  Luis Benítez
 Assistant coach:  Juan Zayas

References

External links
 Llaneras Website

Llaneras